The Journal of Enzyme Inhibition and Medicinal Chemistry is a peer-reviewed open access medical journal published by Taylor & Francis that covers research on enzyme inhibitors and inhibitory processes as well as agonist/antagonist receptor interactions in the development of medicinal and anti-cancer agents. The editor-in-chief is Claudiu T. Supuran.

Abstracting and indexing 
The Journal of Enzyme Inhibition and Medicinal Chemistry is abstracted and indexed in:

External links 
 

Medicinal chemistry journals
Enzyme inhibitors
Publications established in 1985
Bimonthly journals